The 1969 William & Mary Indians football team was an American football team that represented the College of William & Mary as a member of the Southern Conference (SoCon) during the 1969 NCAA University Division football season. In their first season under head coach Lou Holtz, William & Mary compiled a 3–7 record, with a mark of 2–2 in conference play, placing fourth in the SoCon.

Schedule

References

William and Mary
William & Mary Tribe football seasons
William